Lope de Ulloa y Lemos (1572? in Galicia – December 8, 1620 in Concepcion); Spanish soldier designated by the viceroy of Peru Francisco de Borja y Aragón, Prince of Esquilache, carried out the position of Captain General and Governor of Chile, and president of the Real Audiencia of Chile. His government in Chile lasted for two years, between January 1618 and December 1620, the date of his death.  It was believed that he had been poisoned.

Sources

1620 deaths
Royal Governors of Chile
Spanish soldiers
Year of birth unknown
Year of birth uncertain